The 2021 World Rugby Americas Pacific Challenge will be the fourth tournament of the Americas Pacific Challenge, which is a development competition for the Americas and Pacific island nations. However, due to travel restriction only Americas countries will feature, with Paraguay replacing Samoa A. The competition will be once again hosted by Uruguay with all games played at the 14,000 capacity stadium Estadio Charrúa in Montevideo.

Format
With six teams in the tournament and a limitation of three matches per team, a "split pool" format will be used. The field was split into two pools, with teams in one pool only playing the teams in the other. The competing teams are:

Pool A

Pool B

Table
Final standings for combined pools:

Fixtures
All times are local UYT (UTC-03)

Round 1

Round 2

Round 3

See also
 2021 end-of-year rugby union internationals
 Americas Rugby Championship
 World Rugby Pacific Challenge

References
https://www.americasrugbynews.com/2021/10/25/americas-pacific-challenge-round-2-preview-3/

World Rugby Americas Pacific Challenge
Americas Pacific
2021 in Uruguayan sport
2021 in Argentine rugby union
2021 in American rugby union
International rugby union competitions hosted by Uruguay